Afro-Arabs, African Arabs or Black Arabs are Arabs of full or partial Black African descent. These include populations within mainly the Emiratis, Yemenis, Saudis, Omanis, Sahrawis, Mauritanians, Algerians, Egyptians, Sudanese and Moroccans,  with considerably long established communities in Arab states such as Palestine, Iraq, Syria, and Jordan.

Overview

South Arabia and Africa have been in contact commencing with the obsidian exchange networks of the 7th millennium BC. These networks were strengthened by the rise of Egyptian dynasties of the 4th millennium BC. Scientists have indicated the likely existence of settlements in Arabia from the people of the Horn of Africa as early as 3rd and 2nd millennia BC.

The Afro-Arab Tihama culture, which originated in Africa, began in the 2nd millennium BC. This cultural complex is found in Africa in countries such as Somalia, Eritrea, Ethiopia and Sudan, as well as in neighbouring Yemen and the Saudi coastal plains. In the 1st millennium BC, Southern Arabs gained control of the Red Sea trade routes and established the first kingdom in Yemen, Saba, at around 800 BC. As a result of Saba's influence, Eritrea and the northern Ethiopia was gradually incorporated into the area of Arabian influence. In 600 BC, the formation of the Habesha-Sabean state of Daamat arose in Eritrea and in the Tigray region of Ethiopia. Many Sabean scripts has found in Eritrea and even the name Saba is very common feminine name in Eritrea as well as in Tigray. Yemenites and the Habeshites share  cultural,scriptural, racial and historical matters. The Somali peoples although ancient are thought to be an intermix between Yemenis and the indigenous peoples who occupied Somalia at the time nearly 7000 years ago. 

After several centuries of isolation, the Kingdom of Aksum arose in 100 AD. This kingdom existed for 800 years and occupied southern Arabia for part of this period. Utilitarian Aksumite pottery has been found in large quantities in deposits from the 5th and 6th centuries in the Yemen Hadhramaut, suggesting that there may have been substantial immigration during that period.

Southern Arabia was a client state of the Aksumite kingdom throughout the 6th century. Himyarite inscriptions document an invasion of Mecca by an ambitious Aksumite general named Abraha (Tigrinya: አብርሃ) in the year 570 AD. An early incident in post-Islamic Afro-Arab relations, known as the First Hijrah, (Arabic: الهجرة إلى الحبشة, al-hijra ʾilā al-habaša), was an episode in the early history of Islam, where the first companions of the Prophet Muhammad (the Sahabah) fled from the persecution of the ruling Quraysh tribe of Mecca. They sought refuge in the Christian Kingdom of Aksum, in present-day Eritrea and northern Ethiopia (formerly referred to as Habesha land/Abyssinia, an ancient name whose origin is debated), In 613 or 615 AD, the Aksumite monarch who received them is referred to as Ashama ibn Abjar or the Negus (Arabic: نجاشي, najāšī). Modern historians have alternatively identified him with King Armah and Ella Tsaham. Some of the companions later returned to Mecca and made the hijra to Medina with Muhammad, while others remained in Habesha land until they came to Medina in 628. The mosque they established is called the Mosque of the Companions (Arabic: مَسْجِد ٱلصَّحَابَة, romanized: Masjid aṣ-Ṣaḥābah) in the city of Massawa,Eritrea. Dating to the early 7th century AD, it is believed to be the first mosque on the African continent. Many companions settled there after Islam became established in the Arabian peninsula and the descendants of these companions still reside in the region.

By around the 1st millennium AD, Bantu fishermen established trading towns on what is now called the Swahili Coast, which between the tenth and twelfth century became Arabized. The Portuguese conquered these trading centers after the discovery of the Cape Road. From the 1700s to the early 1800s, Muslim forces of the Omani empire re-seized these market towns, especially on the islands of Pemba and Zanzibar. In these territories, Arabs from Yemen and Oman settled alongside the local "African" populations, thereby spreading Islam and establishing Afro-Arab communities. The Niger-Congo Swahili language and culture largely evolved through these contacts between Arabs and the native Bantu population.

In North Africa, Arabs had close connections to the native Africans; however, racial discrimination still plays a major role on segregating Afro-Arabs from mainstream Arab population, as in Tunisia, Algeria, Libya and Morocco.

In the Arab states of the Persian Gulf, descendants of people from the Swahili Coast perform traditional Liwa and Fann at-Tanbura music and dance, and the mizmar is also played by Afro-Arabs in the Tihamah and Hejaz. The ancestors of these people were originally brought to the Persian Gulf as slaves. Today, they are fully recognised citizens of the Persian Gulf states, despite the fact that they do not have any Arab ancestry.

In addition, Stambali of Tunisia and Gnawa music of Morocco are both ritual music and dances that in part trace their origins to West African musical styles.

Notable Afro-Arabs

Bandar bin Sultan Al Saud, Saudi politician and member of the Saudi royal family 
 Etab, Saudi Arabian singer
 Anwar Sadat, Egyptian politician
 Ali Al-Habsi, Omani footballer
 Mohamed Al-Deayea, Saudi footballer
 Shikabala, Egyptian footballer
 Mohammed Hussein Al-Amoudi, Saudi Arabian billionaire of Ethiopian and Yemeni descent

See also

 Al-Akhdam
 Afro-Iranians
 Afro-Turks
 Arab slave trade
 Black Guard
 Gnawa
 Haratin
 Shirazi people
 Swahili people
 Zanj

Citations

Bibliography

External links
 Arab Slave Trade Afo-Arab relations and the Arab Slave Trade
 "Black Africans in (Arab) West Asia" - a cited ColorQ.org essay
 Prof. Helmi Sharawy, Arab Culture and African Culture: ambiguous relations, paper extracted from the book The Dialogue between the Arab culture and other cultures', Arab League, Educational, Cultural and Scientific Organisation (ALECSO), Tunis, 1999.
 Resolution on Afro-arab Co-operation of The Council of Ministers of the Organization of African Unity, 23, February 23–28, 1987.
 African Union/league of Arab States Inter-secretariat Consultative Meeting On Afro-arab Cooperation, Addis Ababa: 10–12 May 2005.
 Maho M. Sebiane, « Le statut socio-économique de la pratique musicale aux Émirats arabes unis : la tradition du leiwah à Dubai », Chroniques yéménites, 14, 2007..
 Afro-Arabian origins of the Early Yemenites and their Conquest and Settlement of Spain

 
Arab groups
Multiracial affairs
Arab world-related lists
Ethnic groups in the Middle East